Fugard is a surname. Notable people with the surname include:

Athol Fugard (born 1932), South African playwright, novelist, actor, and director
Lisa Fugard, South African-born American actress and writer, daughter of Athol and Sheila
Sheila Meiring Fugard (born 1932), South African writer